Events from the year 1883 in Denmark.

Incumbents
 Monarch — Christian IX
 Prime minister — J. B. S. Estrup

Events

 11 October  The Russian tsar family departs from Copenhagen.

Undated
 Emil Christian Hansen from Carlsberg develops a method for propagating pure yeast which revolutionises the brewing industry. The yeast is named Saccharomyces Carlsbergensis after the brewery.

Births
 3 February – Aksel Jørgensen, painter and wood engraver (d. 1957)
 11 February – Paul von Klenau, composer and conductor (d. 1946)
 19 August – Emilius Bangert, composer and organist (d. 1962)

Deaths
 2 May — Christian Hansen, architect (b. 1803)
 4 May — Thorald Brendstrup, painter (b. 1812)
 July 24 — Jens Adolf Jerichau, painter (b. 1816)

References

 
1880s in Denmark
Denmark
Years of the 19th century in Denmark